Sosnovka is a rural locality (a village) in Kharovskoye Rural Settlement, Kharovsky District, Vologda Oblast, Russia. The population was 3 as of 2002.

Geography 
Sosnovka is located 20 km southwest of Kharovsk (the district's administrative centre) by road. Pochinok is the nearest rural locality.

References 

Rural localities in Kharovsky District